On the Level is a 1975 album by English rock band Status Quo.

On the Level may also refer to:

 On the Level, a 1915 American silent film directed by William Worthington
 On the Level (1917 film), an American silent Western film
 On the Level (1930 film), an American action film
 "On the Level", a 2000 single by Yomanda